Tamarin "Tammy" Breedt (born 29 March 1986) is a South African politician who is the national youth leader of the Freedom Front Plus (FF Plus). She has been serving as a Member of the National Assembly of South Africa since May 2019. She was previously a Member of the Free State Provincial Legislature. Breedt is married to fellow FF Plus MP Wouter Wessels.

Early life
Breedt was born on 29 March 1986 in Johannesburg, South Africa. She studied at the University of the Free State. She was a member of the university's student council and also served as the speaker of the Student Parliament.

Career
Breedt was soon employed as the FF Plus' liaison at the Mangaung Metropolitan Municipality. She currently serves as the national youth leader of the FF Plus and is a member of the party's federal council, the federal committee and the Free State executive committee.

Following her husband's deployment to the National Assembly in December 2017, she filled his position in the Free State Provincial Legislature.

In May 2019, she was elected to the National Assembly. She took office on 22 May 2019. She and Heloïse Denner are the first women to represent the FF Plus in Parliament. She serves on the Portfolio Committee on Agriculture, Land Reform and Rural Development.

Personal life
She married Wouter Wessels in 2015. In 2018, they were the victims of a home burglary.

References

External links
Tamarin Breedt – People's Assembly
Ms Tamarin Breedt – Parliament of South Africa

Living people
People from Johannesburg
People from Bloemfontein
1986 births
Members of the National Assembly of South Africa
Freedom Front Plus politicians
University of the Free State alumni
Afrikaner people